Valdieri is a comune (municipality) in the Province of Cuneo in the Italian region Piedmont, located about  southwest of Turin and about  southwest of Cuneo, on the border with France. It is part of the Valle Gesso.

Valdieri borders the following municipalities: Aisone, Borgo San Dalmazzo, Demonte, Entracque, Isola (France), Moiola, Roaschia, Roccavione, Saint-Martin-Vésubie (France), Valdeblore (France), and Vinadio.

Main sights 
Monte Argentera, the highest peak in the Maritime Alps.
 Giardino Botanico Alpino Valderia

References

External links
 Official website

Cities and towns in Piedmont